Lagenida is an order of benthic foraminiferal protists in which the tests (shells) are monolamellar, with walls composed of optically and ultra-structurally radiate calcite, with the crystallographic c-axes perpendicular to the surface. Lagenids first appear in the Upper Silurian and continue to the Recent. They are currently divided into two superfamilies, the older Robuloidacea which range from the Upper Silurian to the Lower Cretaceous (Albian) and the younger Nodosariacea, ranging from the Permian to Recent.

Taxonomic history
Lagenida (suborder Lagenina in Loeblich and Tappan 1988) is an emendation of the rotaliid superfamily Nodosariacea, removing it from the Rotaliina in the Treatise on Invertebrate Paleontology (Loeblich and Tappan, 1964) and combining it with the Robuloidacea, named by Reiss, 1963, to form a new order Lagenida.

Robuloidacea includes families previously included in the Fusulinida and found in either of the superfamilies Parathuramminacea and Endothyracea. Provided that robuloidaceans did actually give rise to nodoceriacea in the Triassic, the ultimate ancestry of Lagenida can be found within Fusulinida, but not the better known Fusulinacea.

Test morphology
Shells (tests) of Lagenida are generally serial in form, with chambers in a line.  They may be unilocular with chambers singularly one after the other, or in sets of twos or threes, (bilicular or trilocular). Some trochoidally coiled forms are known. Some have later chambers that are flared out like a fan, others are shaped like leaves.

Lagenida differ from Rotaliida in the manner in which new septa are formed. In both, when a new chamber is formed a new layer of material is added to the outer surface of the entire shell. In the Lagenida, that layer is used to form only the last, or new, septum. All septa remain monolamellar. In the Rotaliida the outer layer not only forms the final septum, but also coats the front of the previous septum, so that only the final septum in monolamellar.

References

 
 Loeblich & Tappan, 1988. Foraminiferal genera and their classification.

Foraminifera orders